Brierley Hill is a town and electoral ward in the Metropolitan Borough of Dudley, West Midlands, England, 3 miles south of Dudley and 2 miles north of Stourbridge. Part of the Black Country and in a heavily industrialised area, it has a population of 13,935 at the 2011 census. It is best known for glass and steel manufacturing, although industry has declined considerably since the 1970s. One of the largest factories in the area was the Round Oak Steelworks, which closed down and was redeveloped in the 1980s to become the Merry Hill Shopping Centre. Brierley Hill was originally in Staffordshire.

Since 2008, Brierley Hill has been designated as the Strategic Town Centre of the Dudley Borough.

History
The name Brierley Hill derives from the Old English words 'brer', meaning the place where the Briar Rose grew; 'leah', meaning a woodland clearing; and 'hill'.

Largely a product of the Industrial Revolution, Brierley Hill has a relatively recent history, with the first written records of the town dating back to the 17th century. Originally established as a settlement in the woodland of Pensnett Chase, it began expanding rapidly following the chase's enclosure in 1748, and was first recorded on a map in 1785 after the mapping of the Stourbridge Canal.

Brierley Hill had become heavily industrialized by the beginning of the 19th century, with a number of quarries, collieries, glass works, and iron works emerging. Pigot and Co.'s National Commercial Directory for 1828-9 describes Brierley Hill as a hamlet with extensive iron works manufacturing rod, bar and sheet iron, tanks and boilers. 

A National School was opened in the town in 1835, and a market area had developed along the High Street.

By the start of the 20th century, the raw material deposits had become depleted, leading to the closure of many of the industries in the area. The decline in manufacturing resulted in an unemployment rate of 25% in Brierley Hill by the early 1980s, with the closure of the Round Oak Steelworks in December 1982 resulting in a further 1,300 redundancies. The steelworks site, along with the adjacent Merry Hill Farm, were subsequently designated as an Enterprise Zone, and were redeveloped to create the Merry Hill Shopping Centre and The Waterfront business park.

In recent years, proposals have been drawn up by the local authority to regenerate Brierley Hill, with the Brierley Hill Regeneration Partnership formed to improve the town over a period of 10 years, by investing in the infrastructure and increasing the number of homes and job opportunities.

Civic history
Originally part of Staffordshire, Brierley Hill became an urban district in 1894 under the Local Government Act. Previously, it had been an urban sanitary authority. The urban district expanded greatly in 1934 after taking in most of the Kingswinford and Quarry Bank districts, and made a failed bid to obtain borough status in 1952. It became part of the Dudley County Borough in 1966, now the Dudley Metropolitan Borough.

Governance
Brierley Hill is part of the Dudley Metropolitan Borough, in the West Midlands county in England. The Brierley Hill electoral ward is currently represented by three Labour councillors on the borough council; Rachel Harris, Zafar Islam, and Margaret Wilson.

On a national level, the ward forms part of the Dudley South constituency, with the Conservative MP Mike Wood currently elected.

Places of interest

The Merry Hill Shopping Centre is located immediately east of Brierley Hill. One of the largest shopping centres in the UK, it was built between 1985 and 1989 on the grounds of Merry Hill Farm, the last working urban farm in the West Midlands.

Round Oak Steelworks was built in 1857 on land overlooking the site of what is now the Merry Hill Centre, and employed up to 3,000 people at its peak, but that figure had fallen to just over 1,200 by the time it closed in December 1982. The adjacent Waterfront office complex was built on the former steelworks site, being developed between 1989 and 1995, although since the onset of the recession in the late 2000s around half of its office units have become empty, with an application for government-funded Enterprise Zone status rejected. The original T.H. Baker store was on the High Street, central to the town since 1888. The store closed in July 2018. The West Bromwich Building Society had intended to relocate to the Waterfront from its previous base in West Bromwich in 2012, although the plan was later shelved.

Brierley Hill Civic Hall, situated on Bank Street in the town centre, hosted several of Slade's first gigs during the early 1970s, although none of the members were actually from Brierley Hill.

Geography

Brockmoor
Brockmoor is situated to the immediate north of the town centre. On the border with Wordsley was the Bottle and Glass Inn, erected on the bank of the Dudley Canal in about 1800 as The Bush. It remained here until 1980, when it was transferred to the Black Country Living Museum as a centrepiece of the then new village.

It is also home to Brockmoor Primary School, which has existed at its current site in Belle Isle since 1994. The original school was built in the late 19th century, as an infant school for 5–7 year olds and a junior school for 7–11 year olds; it became a first school for 5–8 year olds and a middle school for 8–12 year olds in September 1972. However, the two schools merged in September 1989 to form Brockmoor Primary School and a year later the age range was altered to 5–11.

Pensnett
Pensnett is situated more than a mile north of the town centre and borders the townships of Sedgley, Kingswinford and Dudley.
Pensnett and Kingswinford feature McDonald's, Premier Inn, Beefeater, Co-op Food (formerly Somerfield), Booker Wholesale, Tesco Express, Greggs, and Sainsbury's Local. An Aldi store opened in 2017 on Dudley Road in a former Focus.

Withymoor Village
Withymoor Village lies to the south of the town centre towards the border with Stourbridge, and was mostly developed in the 1970s and 1980s, following open cast coalmining. A Sainsbury's store is at the centre of the village.

Chapel Street Estate
Chapel Street Estate was developed during the 1960s with predominantly multi storey flats on the site of a Victorian residential area.

Quarry Bank
Quarry Bank is situated to the south-east of the town centre and leads to the border with Cradley Heath and Stourbridge .

Hawbush Estate
Hawbush Estate stands one mile to the west of the town centre and was developed in the late 1920s and early 1930s.

Transport
Brierley Hill is situated along the main A461 road between Stourbridge and Dudley, with other roads providing connections to neighbouring locations. A bypass now diverts the road on a new alignment behind the Asda store rather than through the town centre. It is also served by numerous bus services, with a bus station situated at the Merry Hill Shopping Centre, and several bus stops along the main High Street. Buses from Brierley Hill and Merry Hill provide links to central Dudley, Halesowen, Stourbridge, Walsall, West Bromwich, and Wolverhampton, among others.

From 1850 to 1962, Brierley Hill was served by a railway station for passengers on the Oxford-Worcester-Wolverhampton Line between Dudley Town and Stourbridge Junction, before passenger services were withdrawn. This was before the Beeching Axe came into effect in 1964. The section of line from Stourbridge to Brierley Hill is still in use for goods trains, with a railway steel terminal opening in 1986, but the line northbound to Dudley has been closed since 1993. Currently, the nearest passenger railway station is Cradley Heath, over a mile south-east of the town.

Under current plans, an under construction extension to the West Midlands Metro will see the railway line north of Brierley Hill re-opened, with light rail services providing a link to the existing Metro line in Wednesbury and Dudley to the north and Stourbridge to the south. Though there is some speculation as to where in Brierley Hill the metro will route, with two suggested options. Number one being that the metro follows the disused South Staffs line. Number two being that the line diverts at Canal Street in Woodside and travels through The Waterfront and then through the Merry Hill Centre before travelling along Brierley Hill High Street, which under current plans may mean that the High Street is pedestrianised.

Public services
West Midlands Police have their main Dudley area station in Brierley Hill, situated on the corner of Bank Street, next to the Civic Hall. The police station was originally built in the 1960s as the future local council offices, but the plan was scrapped when Brierley Hill became a part of the Dudley Borough.

There is also a fire station located on the Dudley Road, with fire and rescue services provided by the West Midlands Fire Service.

Education
The town currently has 10 primary schools and one secondary school. Thorns Community College and The Crestwood School are now the town's only secondary schools due to the closure of Pensnett High School.

Brierley Hill runs a system of 5–7 infant, 7–11 junior and 11–16 secondary schools, in accordance with the rest of the Dudley borough and the majority of schools in other areas.

However (along with Dudley, Sedgley and Coseley) it ran a system of 5–8 first, 8–12 middle and 12–16 secondary schools from 1972 until 1990, before reverting to the traditional age ranges.

Primary schools
 Brierley Hill Primary School
 Brockmoor Primary School
 Crestwood Park Primary School
 Mount Pleasant Primary School
 Quarry Bank Primary School
 St Mark's Primary School
 St Mary's RC Primary School
 Bromley-Pensnett Primary School
 Thorns Primary School
 Withymoor Primary School
 Peters Hill Primary School
 Thorns Primary School is a primary school located in Brierley Hill, West Midlands, England.

The school serves the Quarry Bank area which is situated approximately one mile south of the town centre, and there are currently around 175 pupils aged 5–11 on the roll. The current head teacher is Mr David Priestley.

Secondary schools
 Thorns Collegiate Academy
 Pensnett High School, closed in July 2010, stayed open until July 2012 as a learning centre for the oldest two age groups in the school, but is now closed permanently and has been demolished apart from a special school, Pens Meadow School, which occupies part of the site.

Religion

The first religious building in Brierley Hill was St. Michael's Chapel, which was constructed in 1765 by public subscription. It became a parish church in 1842, covering the areas of Brockmoor, Delph, and Quarry Bank. In 1872, construction commenced on St. Mary's Catholic Church. Designed by E. W. Pugin, it was completed in 1873 and upon completion, consisted of a nave, sanctuary, aisle and side chapel. There are also Methodist and Baptist churches in the town.

There is also a Chinese Buddhist temple located in Brierley Hill, to cater for the Buddhist community of the Dudley Borough.

Brierley Hill War Memorial sits outside St. Michael's.

Notable residents

 John Corbett (1817-1901), industrialist, was born in the town.
 Anthony Clarke Booth VC (1846–1899), recipient of the Victoria Cross for service during the Zulu War, died in Brierley Hill.
 Don Richardson (1930-2007), the man who developed the Merry Hill Shopping Centre, was born in the town, just streets away from the land that he developed for mass commercialisation more than 50 years later.
 Trevor Smith (1936-2003), former professional footballer for Birmingham City & Walsall F.C.
 Danny Batth (1990- ), professional footballer for Stoke City

See also
Royal Brierley (glass makers)

References

External links
 Brierley Hill Regeneration Partnership
 Brierley Hill Project

 
Towns in the West Midlands (county)
Areas of Dudley